The following is a list of deaths in October 2009.

Entries for each day are listed alphabetically by surname. A typical entry lists information in the following sequence:

 Name, age, country of citizenship at birth, subsequent country of citizenship (if applicable), reason for notability, cause of death (if known), and reference.

October 2009

1
Otar Chiladze, 76, Georgian writer, heart failure.
André-Philippe Futa, 66, Congolese politician, Minister of the Economy and Foreign Trade (since 2002).
Gunnar Haarberg, 92, Norwegian television presenter.
Syed Kamal, 72, Pakistani actor.
Lou Moro, 91, Canadian footballer and football coach.
V. M. Muddiah, 80, Indian cricketer, stroke.
Bhandit Rittakol, 58, Thai film director, producer and screenwriter, heart failure.
Cintio Vitier, 88, Cuban poet.

2
Alain Bernheim, 86, French-born American film producer, complications from dialysis.
Marek Edelman, 86, Polish political and social activist, cardiologist, last surviving leader of the Warsaw Ghetto Uprising.
Jack Evans, 80, Australian politician, Senator (1983–1984), co-founder of the Australian Democrats, cancer.
Nat Finkelstein, 76, American photographer and photojournalist.
Jørgen Jensen, 65, Danish Olympic runner. 
John "Mr. Magic" Rivas, 53, American radio personality, heart attack.
Saleh Meki, 61, Eritrean cabinet minister and politician, heart attack.
Peg Mullen, 92, American author, subject of film Friendly Fire.
Desmond Plummer, Baron Plummer of St. Marylebone, 95, British politician, leader of Greater London Council (1967–1973).
Rolf Rüssmann, 58, German football manager, prostate cancer.
Herman D. Stein, 92, American professor (Case Western Reserve University).
Harvey Veniot, 93, Canadian MLA for Pictou West (1956–1974), Speaker of the Nova Scotia House of Assembly (1961–1968).
Shaun Wylie, 96, British mathematician and World War II codebreaker.

3
Alexander Basilaia, 67, Georgian composer.
Vladimir Beekman, 80, Estonian writer and translator.
Fernando Caldeiro, 51, Argentine-born American astronaut, brain cancer.
Fatima of Libya, 98, Libyan Queen of Libya (1951–1969), widow of King Idris I.
Robert Kirby, 61, British folk rock arranger.
Ernie Lopez, 64, American boxer, complications from dementia.
Reinhard Mohn, 88, German entrepreneur and publisher, founder of Bertelsmann Foundation.
Michel Nédélec, 69, French Olympic cyclist.
Vasile Louis Puscas, 94, American Bishop of St George's in Canton in the Romanian Catholic Church.
Frank Zoppetti, 93, American football player.

4
Koichi Haraguchi, 68, Japanese chief of staff, Imperial House of Japan, heart attack.
Veikko Huovinen, 82, Finnish writer.
Fred Kaan, 80, Dutch-born British clergyman and hymn writer.
Grace Keagy, 87, American actress, ovarian cancer.
Ernő Kolczonay, 56, Hungarian Olympic silver medal-winning fencer (1980, 1992).
*James Lin Xili, 91, Chinese underground first Bishop of Wenzhou (since 1992), Alzheimer's disease.
Shōichi Nakagawa, 56, Japanese politician, Minister of Finance (2008–2009).
Nikiforos, 78, Greek bishop of Didymoteicho.
Günther Rall, 91, German Luftwaffe flying ace during World War II, heart attack.
Mercedes Sosa, 74, Argentinian folk singer, liver failure.
Bronisław Żurakowski, 98, Polish aerospace engineer.

5
Armando Acosta Cordero, 88, Cuban guerrilla.
Mike Alexander, 32, British bassist (Evile), pulmonary embolism.
Tommy Capel, 87, English footballer (Nottingham Forest).
Leon Clarke, 76, American football player (Los Angeles Rams), pancreatitis.
James Duesenberry, 91, American economist.
Israel Gelfand, 96, Russian mathematician.
Gino Giugni, 82, Italian minister of labor and social security (1993–1994).
Giselher Klebe, 84, German composer.
David Lake, 66, American winemaker.
Sir Hugh Lloyd-Jones, 87, British classical scholar.
Brian Powell, 35, American baseball player, suicide by gunshot.
René Sommer, 58, Swiss inventor, co-inventor of the computer mouse.
Johnny Williams, 77, English rugby union player.

6
Jimmy Bates, 99, Australian football player, oldest living Australian Football League player.
Pamela Blake, 94, American actress, natural causes.
Douglas Campbell, 87, Scottish-born Canadian actor, complications of diabetes and heart disease.
Raymond Federman, 81, French-born American writer and academic, cancer.
Aengus Finucane, 77, Irish priest, chief executive of Concern Worldwide (1981–1997).
Pyarelal Khandelwal, 84, Indian politician, cancer.
Werner Maihofer, 90, German Minister of the Interior (1974–1978).
Donna Mae Mims, 82, American race driver, first female SCCA champion, stroke.
Ramanna Rai, 79, Indian politician.
Gilberto Zaldívar, 75, American founder of the Repertorio Español, complications of dementia with Lewy bodies.

7
Ben Ali, 82, American restaurateur (Ben's Chili Bowl), heart failure.
Bikram Keshari Deo, 58, Indian politician, cardiac arrest.
Steve Ferguson, 60, American guitarist (NRBQ), cancer.
Irving Penn, 92, American fashion photographer (Vogue).
Shelby Singleton, 77, American record producer and record label owner (Sun Records), brain cancer.
Helen Watts, 81, British contralto.
Pedro E. Zadunaisky, 91, Argentinian astronomer and mathematician.

8
Gordon Boyd, 86, British-born Australian television personality.
James Delgrosso, 66, American politician, mayor of Bethlehem, Pennsylvania (2003–2004), leukemia.
Gerald Ferguson, 72, American-born Canadian artist.
Juan Carlos Mareco, 83, Uruguayan actor.
Alex McCrae, 89, Scottish football player (Middlesbrough) and manager (Falkirk).
Torsten Reißmann, 53, German Olympic judoka.
Jean Sage, 68, French racing driver, former sporting director of the Renault F1 team.
Michael Angelo Saltarelli, 77, American Roman Catholic Bishop of Wilmington (1995–2008), bone cancer.
Abu Talib, 70, American blues musician, cancer.
Sir Sydney Walling, 102, Antiguan cricketer.

9
Arne Bakker, 79, Norwegian football and bandy player.
Francis Baldacchino, 73, Maltese-born Bishop of Malindi, Kenya.
Raymond A. Brown, 94, American lawyer, chronic obstructive pulmonary disease.
Aldo Buzzi, 99, Italian author and architect.
Arturo "Zambo" Cavero, 68, Peruvian folk singer, complications from sepsis.
Jacques Chessex, 75, Swiss author, first non-French recipient of the Prix Goncourt, heart attack.
Anne Friedberg, 57, American professor (USC School of Cinematic Arts), colorectal cancer
Vyacheslav Ivankov, 69, Russian crime figure, gunshot wounds.
Stuart M. Kaminsky, 75, American mystery writer, hepatitis.
Barry Letts, 84, British television actor, director and producer (Doctor Who).
John Daido Loori, 78, American Zen Buddhist monk, lung cancer.
Hermann Raich, 75, Austrian Roman Catholic Bishop of Wabag (1982–2008).
Louis Sanmarco, 97, French administrator, governor (1954–1957) and High Commissioner (1957–1958) of Ubangi-Shari.
Richard Sonnenfeldt, 86, German-born American interpreter at the Nuremberg Trials, complications from a stroke.
Dré Steemans, 55, Belgian television and radio host, cardiac arrest.
Horst Szymaniak, 75, German footballer.
Rusty Wier, 65, American country music singer-songwriter, cancer.

10
Luis Aguilé, 73, Argentine singer and songwriter, stomach cancer.
Paul Bloom, 70, American lawyer, recovered $6 billion for the Department of Energy, pancreatic cancer.
Sonny Bradshaw, 83, Jamaican jazz musician, stroke.
Stephen Gately, 33, Irish pop singer (Boyzone), pulmonary edema.
Larry Jansen, 89, American baseball player (New York Giants, Cincinnati Reds), heart failure and pneumonia.
Edward Knight, 82, American actor.
Joan Orenstein, 85, British-born Canadian actress.
Lionel Pincus, 78, American businessman, founder of Warburg Pincus.
Jack Rose, 92, British WWII fighter pilot and colonial administrator.
Carol Tomlinson-Keasey, 66, American psychologist, breast cancer.

11
Joan Martí i Alanis, 80, Spanish archbishop, Bishop of Urgell and co-Prince of Andorra (1971–2003).
Peter Callanan, 74, Irish politician, member of the Seanad (since 1997).
Patrick Hannan, 68, British broadcaster, author and journalist.
Gustav Kral, 26, Austrian footballer, car accident.
Abigail McLellan, 40, Scottish artist, multiple sclerosis.
Veronika Neugebauer, 40, German voice actress, colorectal cancer.
Alan Peters, 76, British furniture designer.
Halit Refiğ, 75, Turkish film director, cholangiocarcinoma.

12
Samy Abu Zaid, 30, Egyptian footballer, car accident.
Maurice Agis, 77, British sculptor.
Dietrich von Bothmer, 90, German-born American art historian, curator of the Metropolitan Museum of Art.
Alberto Castagnetti, 66, Italian Olympic swimmer, complications from cardiac surgery.
Mildred Cohn, 96, American biochemist.
Mikheil Kalatozishvili, 50, Russian film director, script writer and producer, heart attack.
Donald Kaufman, 79, American toy car collector, heart attack.
Brendan Mullen, 60, American punk impresario and club owner (The Masque), stroke.
Stan Palk, 87, English footballer (Liverpool, Port Vale).
Dickie Peterson, 63, American rock singer (Blue Cheer), liver cancer.
Joe Rosen, 88, American Golden Age comic book letterer.
Frank Vandenbroucke, 34, Belgian cyclist, pulmonary embolism.
Ian Wallace, 90, British bass-baritone singer.

13
Stephen Barnett, 73, American legal scholar, opposed the Newspaper Preservation Act of 1970, cardiac arrest.
Cullen Bryant, 58, American football player (Los Angeles Rams), natural causes.
Rodger Doxsey, 62, American physicist and astronomer, cancer.
Richard Foster, 63, American member of the Alaska House of Representatives, heart and kidney disease.
Eugene Maxwell Frank, 101, American bishop of The Methodist Church.
Atle Jebsen, 73, Norwegian shipowner and businessman, traffic collision.
William Wayne Justice, 89, American federal judge.
*Lü Zhengcao, 104, Chinese general, last survivor of the original Shang Jiang.
Winston Ngozi Mankunku, 66, South African saxophone player.
Al Martino, 82, American singer and actor (The Godfather), first person to top the UK Singles Chart.
Daniel Melnick, 77, American studio executive, film producer and television producer, lung cancer.
Paul Barbă Neagră, 80, Romanian film director and essayist.
Roger Nixon, 88, American composer, complications from leukemia.
Nan C. Robertson, 83, American Pulitzer Prize-winning journalist and author, heart disease.
Orane Simpson, 26, Jamaican football player, stabbed.
Richard T. Whitcomb, 88, American aeronautical engineer, pneumonia
Werner Zandt, 81, German Olympic sprinter.

14
Lou Albano, 76, American professional wrestler and manager, actor (The Super Mario Bros. Super Show!), heart attack.
Wilf K. Backhaus, 62, Canadian role-playing game designer.
Antônio do Carmo Cheuiche, 82, Brazilian Auxiliary Bishop of Santa Maria (1969–1971) and Porto Alegre (1971–2001).
Fred Cress, 71, British-born Australian artist, Archibald Prize winner (1988), pancreatic cancer.
Roy Lane, 74, British hillclimbing competitor, peritonitis.
C. B. Muthamma, 85, Indian first female diplomat and ambassador.
Willard Varnell Oliver, 88, American Navajo code talker.
Martyn Sanderson, 71, New Zealand actor (The Lord of the Rings: The Fellowship of the Ring).
Bruce Wasserstein, 61, American investment banker and businessman, arrhythmia.
Collin Wilcox, 74, American actress (To Kill a Mockingbird), brain cancer.
Leo Williams, 68, Australian rugby union official.

15
George P. Jenkins, 94, American chairman of Metlife, assisted expansion of ABC and Pan Am, heart failure.
Josias Kumpf, 84, Austrian Nazi concentration camp guard.
Elizabeth Clare Prophet, 70, American New Age religious leader, co-founder of The Summit Lighthouse, Alzheimer's disease.
Tollak B. Sirnes, 86, Norwegian physician, psychiatrist and pharmacologist.
George Tuska, 93, American Golden Age comic book artist (Iron Man).
Heinz Versteeg, 70, Dutch football player, cancer.
Philip L. White, 86, American historian, cancer.

16
Bob Davis, 77, American politician, U.S. Representative for Michigan (1979–1993), heart and kidney failure.
Inglis Drever, 10, British hurdles racehorse, euthanised.
Jose Herrera, 67, Venezuelan baseball player.
Meilė Lukšienė, 96, Lithuanian cultural historian, member of the Sąjūdis.
Andrés Montes, 53, Spanish sports commentator.
Marian Przykucki, 85, Polish Roman Catholic Metropolitan Archbishop of Szczecin-Kamień (1992–1999).
John Ramsden, 61, British historian.

17
Dame Doreen Blumhardt, 95, New Zealand potter.
Carla Boni, 84, Italian singer.
Diana Elles, Baroness Elles, 88, British diplomat and politician.
Jay W. Johnson, 66, American U.S. Representative for Wisconsin (1997–1999), U.S. Mint Director (2000–2001), heart attack.
Vladimir Kashpur, 82, Russian film actor, People's Artist of Russia.
Kazuhiko Katō, 62, Japanese musician (The Folk Crusaders, Sadistic Mika Band), suicide by hanging.
Louisa Mark, 49, British lovers rock singer, complications from a stomach ulcer.
Norma Fox Mazer, 78, American author, brain cancer.
Vic Mizzy, 93, American composer (The Addams Family, Green Acres),
Rosanna Schiaffino, 69, Italian film actress, cancer.
Sheldon Segal, 83, American reproductive biologist.
Michael Shea, 71, British diplomat, press secretary to Queen Elizabeth II (1978–1987), dementia.
Brian Campbell Vickery, 91, British information scientist.

18
Ion Cojar, 78, Romanian actor and film director, Parkinson's disease.
Ruth Duckworth, 90, American sculptor.
Jasper Howard, 20, American football player, stabbed.
Lenore Kandel, 77, American poet, lung cancer.
Leonard B. Keller, 62, American soldier, Medal of Honor recipient, motorcycle accident.
Sir Ludovic Kennedy, 89, British author and journalist, pneumonia.
Adriaan Kortlandt, 91, Dutch biologist.
Ovidiu Muşetescu, 54, Romanian politician, cancer.
Ignacio Ponseti, 95, Spanish physician and inventor (Ponseti method).
Nancy Spero, 83, American artist, heart failure.
Basie Vivier, 82, South African rugby union player, captain of the Springboks (1956).

19
Moni Fanan, 63, Israeli basketball team manager, suicide by hanging.
Werner Heubeck, 85, German-born British managing director of Ulsterbus and Citybus, cancer.
Joe Hutton Jr., 81, American basketball player, heart attack.
Sushila Kerketta, 71, Indian politician, heart attack.
Vladimír Klokočka, 80, Czech politician and jurist, signatory to Charter 77 manifesto.
Shlomo Lorincz, 91, Hungarian-born Israeli politician, heart failure.
Milun Marović, 62, Serbian Olympic basketball player.
Reg McKay, 56, British journalist and crime fiction writer, brain and lung cancer.
Angelo Musi, 91, American basketball player.
Nimma Raja Reddy, 72, Indian politician.
Alberto Testa, 82, Italian composer and lyricist.
Radu Timofte, 60, Romanian intelligence officer, director of the Serviciul Român de Informaţii (2001–2006), leukemia.
Howard Unruh, 88, American spree killer.
Joseph Wiseman, 91, Canadian actor (Dr. No).

20
Margaret Bisbrown, 90, British Olympic diver.
Yvonne Carter, 50, British general practitioner and medical academic, breast cancer.
Attila Dargay, 83, Hungarian animator.
Colin Douglas-Smith, 91, Australian Olympic rower.
Margaret Fitzgerald, 113, Canadian supercentenarian, natural causes.
Clifford Hansen, 97, American politician, Governor of Wyoming (1963–1967) and U.S. Senator (1967–1978).
Robert C. Lautman, 85, American architectural photographer.
Carl Fredrik Lowzow, 82, Norwegian politician.
Charles Mills, 88, American painter.
Doreen Reid Nakamarra, 54, Australian Aboriginal artist, pneumonia.
Jef Nys, 82, Belgian comic book artist (Jommeke).
Sultan Pepper, 47, American comedy writer, Emmy Award winner (The Ben Stiller Show).
Yuri Ryazanov, 22, Russian artistic gymnast, traffic collision.
Winai Senniam, 51, Thai parliamentarian, liver and colon cancer.

21
Andrey Balashov, 63, Russian Olympic silver (1976) and bronze (1980) medal-winning sailor.
Louise Cooper, 57, British novelist, aneurysm.
Lionel Davidson, 87, British novelist, lung cancer.
Clinton Ford, 77, British singer.
John Jarman, 78, Welsh football player (Barnsley, Walsall) and coach.
Iain Macphail, Lord Macphail, 71, British judge and legal scholar.
Paul Massey, 83, British Olympic silver medal-winning (1948) rower.
Yōko Minamida, 76, Japanese actress.
Jack Nelson, 80, American Pulitzer Prize-winning journalist (1960), pancreatic cancer.
Redmond O'Neill, 55, British political activist.
Sirone, 69, American jazz musician.
Ted Sizer, 77, American education reformer, colorectal cancer.
Giuliano Vassalli, 94, Italian politician.

22
Maryanne Amacher, 66, American experimental composer, sound artist, and installation artist, complications from a stroke.
Paul Andrews, 53, Australian politician, cancer.
Nicholas Atkin, 49, British historian, meningitis.
Daniel Bekker, 77, South African boxer, Parkinson's and Alzheimer's diseases.
Ray B. Browne, 87, American educator, scholar of popular culture.
Pierre Chaunu, 86, French historian.
Howard Darwin, 78, Canadian sports promoter, founder of the Ottawa 67's, complications from heart surgery.
Luther Dixon, 78, American songwriter.
Evert Heinström, 97, Finnish Olympic athlete.
Ray Lambert, 87, Welsh footballer (Liverpool, Wales).
Don Lane, 75, American-born Australian entertainer, Alzheimer's disease.
Don Ivan Punchatz, 73, American science fiction artist, cardiac arrest.
Herman Reich, 91, American baseball player (Washington Senators, Chicago Cubs, Cleveland Indians).
Maciej Rybinski, 64, Polish journalist and publicist.
Soupy Sales, 83, American comedian and television host, cancer.
Enver Shehu, 75, Albanian football player and manager.
*Suchart Chaovisith, 69, Thai politician, Finance Minister (2003–2004) and Deputy Prime Minister (2004), laryngeal cancer.
Libero Tresoldi, 88, Italian Roman Catholic Bishop of Crema.
Albert Watson, 91, English footballer (Huddersfield Town, Oldham Athletic).
Elmer Winter, 97, American founder of Manpower Inc.
George Patrick Ziemann, 68, American Roman Catholic Bishop of Santa Rosa.

23
Linda Day, 71, American television director, leukemia and breast cancer.
Trevor Denning, 86, British artist.
Sohrab Fakir, 75, Pakistani folk singer, kidney disease.
Chris Hawk, 58, American surfer, oral cancer.
Lou Jacobi, 95, Canadian-born American actor (The Diary of Anne Frank).
Ture Kailo, Vanuatuan politician and member of parliament.
John Kenley, 103, American summer theater producer, complications of pneumonia.
Shiloh Pepin, 10, American girl with rare sirenomelia condition, pneumonia.
Ken Perkins, 83, British army general.
Jack Poole, 76, Canadian real estate developer, pancreatic cancer.
Ron Sobieszczyk, 75, American basketball player (DePaul Blue Demons, New York Knicks), degenerative brain disease.

24
Bill Chadwick, 94, American hockey official and broadcaster.
Yasuo Iwata, 67, Japanese actor, lung cancer.
Karl Reisinger, 73, Austrian Olympic judoka.

25
Yoshiteru Abe, 68, Japanese professional Go player.
Dee Anthony, 83, American music manager, pneumonia.
Maksharip Aushev, 43, Russian political activist and opposition leader in Ingushetia, businessman (Ingushetia.org), shot.
Adoor Bhavani, 82, Indian actress.
Billy Bibit, 59, Filipino soldier and coup d'état leader, complications from a stroke.
Camillo Cibin, 83, Italian former commander of the Corps of Gendarmerie of Vatican City.
Fritz Darges, 96, German World War II Waffen-SS officer.
Seymour Fromer, 87, American founder of Judah L. Magnes Museum.
Leslie A. Geddes, 88, American electrical engineer and physiologist.
Lawrence Halprin, 93, American architect (Ghirardelli Square, Franklin Delano Roosevelt Memorial).
Gerhard Knoop, 88, Norwegian theatre director.
Chittaranjan Kolhatkar, 86, Indian actor, heart attack.
S. Ashok Kumar, 62, Indian jurist.
René Marigil, 81, Spanish cyclist.
Mike McQueen, 52, American journalist, Associated Press bureau chief for Louisiana and Mississippi, cancer.
Ingeborg Mello, 90, Argentinian Olympic athlete.
Heinz-Klaus Metzger, 77, German music critic.
Lázaro Pérez Jiménez, 66, Mexican Roman Catholic Bishop of Celaya.
Alexander Piatigorsky, 80, Russian-born British philosopher.
Jeffry Picower, 67, American philanthropist, associate of Bernard Madoff, drowned after heart attack.
Kamala Sankrityayan, 89, Indian writer and litterateur.
Tangi Satyanarayana, 78, Indian politician, speaker of the Vidhan Sabha of Andhra Pradesh (1983–1985).
Thea Segall, 80, Romanian photographer who lived in Venezuela since 1958 until her death.
Kevin Widemond, 23, American basketball player, heart attack.

26
Daniel Acharuparambil, 70, Indian Roman Catholic archbishop of Verapoly (since 1996), kidney failure.
Teel Bivins, 61, American member of the Texas Senate (1989–2004), Ambassador to Sweden (2004–2006).
Sabino Fernández Campo, 91, Spanish Chief of the Royal House, key figure in failed 23-F coup d'état.
Lea Fite, 54, American politician, member of the Alabama House of Representatives (since 2002), apparent seizure.
Fred McCarthy, 91, American cartoonist.
Yoshirō Muraki, 85, Japanese film production designer and art director, heart failure.
George Na'ope, 81, American musician and hula expert, founder of the Merrie Monarch Festival, cancer.
Troy Smith, 87, American businessman, founder of Sonic Drive-In chain, natural causes.

27
Tapani Aartomaa, 75, Finnish professor and graphic designer.
Frank Brady, Jr., 64, Irish footballer (Shamrock Rovers), cancer.
John David Carson, 57, American actor (Falcon Crest).
August Coppola, 75, American writer, literature professor and father of Nicolas Cage, heart attack.
Roy DeCarava, 89, American photographer.
Alex Harris, 34, Australian paralympian swimmer, gold medalist (2004), suicide by train.
David Shepherd, 68, British cricketer and umpire, lung cancer.
Paul Zamecnik, 96, American molecular biologist.

28

Olga Kevelos, 85, British motorcycle trials rider.
Leslie King, 59, Trinidadian Olympic cyclist.
Paul Manz, 90, American Lutheran organist and composer.
Taylor Mitchell, 19, Canadian singer–songwriter, coyote attack.
Jerry Morris, 99, British epidemiologist.
Ted Nebbeling, 65, Dutch-born Canadian politician, British Columbia MLA (1996–2005), Mayor of Whistler, colon cancer.

29
Russell L. Ackoff, 90, American organizational theorist, complications from surgery.
*Bei Shizhang, 106, Chinese biologist and educator.
Jean-François Bergier, 77, Swiss historian.
Jan Gąsienica Ciaptak, 86, Polish Olympic skier.
Charles E. Conrad, 84, American acting coach, kidney failure.
Sanyutei Enraku, 76, Japanese comedian (Shōten), lung cancer.
Gino Fracas, 79, Canadian football player.
Olav Hodne, 88, Norwegian missionary.
June Maule, 92, American businesswoman, owner of Maule Air.
John O'Quinn, 68, American lawyer, traffic collision.
Norman Painting, 85, British radio actor (The Archers), heart failure.
Jürgen Rieger, 63, German lawyer and politician (NPD), stroke.
Beat Rüedi, 89, Swiss Olympic bronze medal-winning (1948) ice hockey player.
Alexander Schure, 89, American academic, founder of NYIT, Chancellor of NSU (1970–1985), Alzheimer's disease.
Dave Treen, 81, American politician, Governor of Louisiana (1980–1984), respiratory disease.

30
Juvenal Amarijo, 85, Brazilian football player, respiratory failure.
Norton Buffalo, 58, American singer-songwriter, blues harmonica player (Steve Miller Band), lung cancer.
Ramata Diakite, 32–33, Malian Wassoulou musician, hepatitis A.
Forest Evashevski, 91, American football coach (Iowa Hawkeyes), cancer.
Claude Lévi-Strauss, 100, French anthropologist and author.
Michelle Triola Marvin, 76, American plaintiff in landmark 'palimony' lawsuit (Marvin v. Marvin), lung cancer.
June Middleton, 83, Australian with polio, world's longest survivor in an iron lung.
Alick Rowe, 70, British television and radio writer, heart attack.
Howie Schultz, 87, American baseball and basketball player, cancer.
František Veselý, 65, Czech football player.
Igor Vyazmikin, 43, Russian ice hockey player.
Eugenia A. Wordsworth-Stevenson, Liberian diplomat.

31
Roque Antonio Adames Rodríguez, 81, Dominican Roman Catholic Bishop of Santiago de los Caballeros.
Tim Bickerstaff, 67, New Zealand radio personality.
*Chen Lin, 39, Chinese pop singer, suicide by jumping.
Hugh Dinwiddy, 97, British cricketer.
Stanley Ellis, 83, British linguistics scholar.
Harry Gauss, 57, Canadian soccer coach, brain cancer.
Pat Keysell, 83, British television presenter.
*Lee Hu-rak, 85, South Korean spy chief, Director of the National Intelligence Service (1970–1973), brain tumor.
Mustafa Mahmud, 87, Egyptian scientist, author and philosopher.
John Mason, 89, British historian and librarian.
*Qian Xuesen, 97, Chinese scientist and co-founder of the JPL.
Steve Reid, 94, American football player (Northwestern Wildcats).
Neguinho do Samba, 54, Brazilian percussionist, founder of Olodum, heart failure.
Jan Wejchert, 59, Polish businessman and media mogul, co-founder of ITI Group, co-owner of TVN, heart attack.
Tom Wheatcroft, 87, British businessman, owner of Donington Park race circuit.

References

2009-10
 10